Liocranchia reinhardti is a deep sea squid.

It is found worldwide in tropical and subtropical waters.

References

External links
Tree of Life web project: Liocranchia reinhardti

Squid
Cephalopods described in 1856